The arrondissement of Argentan is an arrondissement of France, located in the Orne department, region of Normandy. It has 123 communes.

Composition

The communes of the arrondissement of Argentan are:

Argentan
Athis-Val de Rouvre
Aubusson
Aunou-le-Faucon
Avoine
Avrilly
Bailleul
Banvou
Bazoches-au-Houlme
La Bazoque
Bellou-en-Houlme
Berjou
Boischampré
Boucé
Brieux
Briouze
Cahan
Caligny
Cerisy-Belle-Étoile
Champcerie
Champsecret
Chanu
La Chapelle-au-Moine
La Chapelle-Biche
Le Châtellier
Commeaux
Coudehard
Coulonces
La Coulonche
Craménil
Domfront en Poiraie
Dompierre
Durcet
Échalou
Écorches
Écouché-les-Vallées
Faverolles
La Ferrière-aux-Étangs
La Ferté-Macé
Flers
Fleuré
Fontaine-les-Bassets
Giel-Courteilles
Ginai
Gouffern en Auge
Le Grais
Guêprei
Habloville
Joué-du-Plain
Juvigny-sur-Orne
La Lande-de-Lougé
La Lande-Patry
La Lande-Saint-Siméon
Landigou
Landisacq
Lignou
Lonlay-l'Abbaye
Lonlay-le-Tesson
Lougé-sur-Maire
Louvières-en-Auge
Le Ménil-Ciboult
Le Ménil-de-Briouze
Ménil-Gondouin
Ménil-Hermei
Ménil-Hubert-sur-Orne
Ménil-Vin
Merri
Messei
Moncy
Montabard
Montilly-sur-Noireau
Mont-Ormel
Montreuil-au-Houlme
Montreuil-la-Cambe
Les Monts d'Andaine
Montsecret-Clairefougère
Monts-sur-Orne
Moulins-sur-Orne
Neauphe-sur-Dive
Nécy
Neuvy-au-Houlme
Occagnes
Ommoy
Le Pin-au-Haras
Pointel
Putanges-le-Lac
Rânes
Ri
Rônai
Sai
Saint-André-de-Briouze
Saint-André-de-Messei
Saint-Bômer-les-Forges
Saint-Brice
Saint-Brice-sous-Rânes
Saint-Christophe-de-Chaulieu
Saint-Clair-de-Halouze
Sainte-Honorine-la-Chardonne
Sainte-Honorine-la-Guillaume
Sainte-Opportune
Saint-Georges-d'Annebecq
Saint-Georges-des-Groseillers
Saint-Gervais-des-Sablons
Saint-Gilles-des-Marais
Saint-Hilaire-de-Briouze
Saint-Lambert-sur-Dive
Saint-Paul
Saint-Philbert-sur-Orne
Saint-Pierre-d'Entremont
Saint-Pierre-du-Regard
Saint-Quentin-les-Chardonnets
Saires-la-Verrerie
Sarceaux
La Selle-la-Forge
Sévigny
Sevrai
Tanques
Tinchebray-Bocage
Tournai-sur-Dive
Trun
Vieux-Pont
Villedieu-lès-Bailleul
Les Yveteaux

History

The arrondissement of Argentan was created in 1800. At the January 2017 reorganisation of the arrondissements of Orne, it gained 11 communes from the arrondissement of Alençon, and it lost nine communes to the arrondissement of Alençon and 49 communes to the arrondissement of Mortagne-au-Perche.

As a result of the reorganisation of the cantons of France which came into effect in 2015, the borders of the cantons are no longer related to the borders of the arrondissements. The cantons of the arrondissement of Argentan were, as of January 2015:

 Argentan-Est
 Argentan-Ouest
 Athis-de-l'Orne
 Briouze
 Écouché
 Exmes
 La Ferté-Frênel
 Flers-Nord
 Flers-Sud
 Gacé
 Le Merlerault
 Messei
 Mortrée
 Putanges-Pont-Écrepin
 Tinchebray
 Trun
 Vimoutiers

References

Argentan